Lena Yada-Draiman (born November 12, 1978) is an American former model, actress, professional tandem surfer, valet and professional wrestler. She is best known for her time in World Wrestling Entertainment (WWE).

Modeling and surfing 
Yada was first runner-up in the 2002 Ms. Venus Swimwear International pageant and is also a former Miss Hawaiian Tropic Japan.

Yada modeled for Bench Warmer International Trading Cards beginning in 2004. She was featured in trading card sets again in 2006, 2008 and 2009. As a Bench Warmer model, Yada has attended red carpet events to promote the cards.

Yada competed in the quarter finals of the 2007 World Title of Tandem Surfing, making it to rank thirteenth. In March 2008, her pair was ranked 14 for the 2008 WTT.

Yada was one of Sprite's campaign models when they changed their logo and could be seen in commercials, online advertising and in movie theaters.  Yada was also a campaign model two years in a row for Sheiki Jeans (whose past campaign model included Jenna Jameson) and for Western Star.  Yada's latest project was lead for Disturbed's music video "The Animal".

Professional wrestling career

World Wrestling Entertainment (2005–2008) 
Yada first came to WWE auditioning for the 2005 WWE Diva Search and made it to the Top 30. She auditioned again in 2007 and made it to the final eight and placed third overall in the competition. On the October 22, 2007, edition of Raw she became the sixth contestant eliminated. On November 10, 2007, however, Yada was signed to WWE and made her SmackDown! television debut on January 4, 2008, as a backstage interviewer, interviewing Matt Striker and Big Daddy V.

After appearing only once on SmackDown!, on January 8, Yada was transferred to ECW. She hosted a "Diva Dance Off" between Kelly Kelly and Layla El, only to suddenly include herself at the end and crown herself the winner. She later became a heel and joined forces with Layla against Kelly Kelly, who had defeated them in a "Best Body" contest. Yada continued as a valet to both Victoria and Layla for the next couple of weeks, but then Yada returned to her role as a backstage interviewer. In the Summer of 2008, Yada began in-ring training at the Ultimate Pro Wrestling facility in California.

Yada participated in the Cyber Sunday annual Halloween Costume Contest. Yada was dressed as a Ninja. On November 3, 2008, on the 800th episode of Raw, Yada won her in-ring televised debut in a 16-wrestler tag team match after then WWE Women's Champion Beth Phoenix pinned Mae Young, although, she was never tagged in. On November 10, 2008, she was released from her WWE contract just a week after her in-ring debut.

Independent circuit (2009) 
After the WWE, Yada won her first singles match against Christina Von Eerie at Pro Wrestling Revolution's show on June 6, 2009, in San Francisco as part of ChickFight, pinning Christina with a schoolgirl roll-up.

Personal life 
On September 25, 2011, Yada married David Draiman, the lead singer of heavy metal bands Disturbed and Device. Their son was born in September 2013.

Filmography

References

External links 

1978 births
Punahou School alumni
Actresses from Honolulu
Female models from Hawaii
American female professional wrestlers
American models of Japanese descent
American sportspeople of Japanese descent
Living people
Professional wrestling dancers
Professional wrestling managers and valets
WWE Diva Search contestants
21st-century American women
21st-century professional wrestlers